The 2000 European Promotion Cup for Cadets was the first edition of the basketball European Promotion Cup for cadets, today known as FIBA U16 European Championship Division C. It was played in Malta from 12 to 16 July 2000. Scotland national under-16 basketball team won the tournament.

Participating teams

Final standings

Results

References

FIBA U16 European Championship Division C
2000–01 in European basketball
FIBA U16
International basketball competitions hosted by Malta
FIBA